The Valley of Glory (Долина Славы) is a valley on the right bank of the Zapadnaya Litsa River. A bloody battle began in the summer of 1941 for the region as German forces launched an offensive towards Murmansk, Russia. Russian forces halted the German assault and the frontline stabilized until the autumn of 1944.

Landforms of Murmansk Oblast
Valleys of Russia
Battles and operations of World War II
Russian history articles needing expert attention
Objects of cultural heritage of Russia of regional significance
Cultural heritage monuments in Murmansk Oblast